John Andrew Darley  (born 15 May 1937) is a former member of the South Australian Legislative Council and a former valuer-general.

Political career (2007–present)
Darley was appointed to the South Australian Legislative Council by a joint sitting of the Parliament of South Australia on 21 November 2007 to replace outgoing Independent No Pokies MLC Nick Xenophon who resigned to contest the Australian Senate at the 2007 federal election. Darley was the third of three candidates on the independent No Pokies upper house ticket at the 2006 state election.

Darley was re-elected at the 2014 state election as the first candidate on the independent Nick Xenophon ticket. In 2015, Nick Xenophon Group (NXG) changed its name to Nick Xenophon Team (NXT).

2018 South Australian election
Darley left the Nick Xenophon Team and became an independent on 17 August 2017 ahead of the 2018 state election. He said: "There are many things I could say as to why I have resigned. However, it is not my place to speak publicly about internal party matters". Though it was stated that there had been months of conflict between Darley and the party, it came to a head a week prior when Darley voted with the Labor government to back Legislative Council voting reforms. Xenophon indicated the resignation had averted Darley's imminent expulsion from the party due to "breaches to party rules". Nick Xenophon's SA-BEST therefore contested the 2018 election without state parliamentary representation.

On 15 September 2017, Darley announced that he would team up with another former Xenophon affiliate, retired lawyer Peter Humphries, to form another new party called Advance SA. Darley's term in the Legislative Council does not expire until 2022, and Humphries was the party's lead candidate for the 2018 election. Darley announced that Advance SA would not run candidates for the lower house, and would not direct preferences to SA-BEST or any other party.

Advance SA received 0.4% of the vote, and did not get any candidates elected at the 2018 election. Darley was not up for re-election. Darley's term continued until 2022, when he was defeated.

References

External links
 

1937 births
Living people
Independent members of the Parliament of South Australia
Members of the South Australian Legislative Council
Recipients of the Medal of the Order of Australia
Place of birth missing (living people)
Nick Xenophon Team politicians
Public servants of South Australia
Valuation professionals
21st-century Australian politicians